The 1951 ICF Canoe Slalom World Championships were held in Steyr, Austria under the auspices of International Canoe Federation. It was the 2nd edition.

Note
Only two teams competed in the men's C1 team event.

Medal summary

Men's

Canoe

Kayak

Women's

Kayak

Medals table

References
Results
International Canoe Federation

Icf Canoe Slalom World Championships, 1951
Icf Canoe Slalom World Championships, 1951
ICF Canoe Slalom World Championships
International sports competitions hosted by Austria
Canoeing in Austria